Normand “Norm” LaPointe (born August 13, 1955) is a Canadian former professional ice hockey goaltender.

Playing career
As a youth he played in the 1965 Quebec International Pee-Wee Hockey Tournament with a minor ice hockey team from Saint-Vincent-de-Paul, Quebec, and the 1967 tournament with a team from Pointe-Claire.  He was selected by the Vancouver Canucks in the 3rd round (46th overall) of the 1975 NHL Amateur Draft, and was also drafted by the Cincinnati Stingers in the 4th round (46th overall) of the 1975 WHA Amateur Draft.  LaPointe played three seasons in the  World Hockey Association with the Cincinnati Stingers. In January 1979, the Fort Wayne Komets traded LaPointe to the Toledo Goaldiggers in exchange for defenceman Peter Brown.

Awards and honours

References

External links

1955 births
Canadian ice hockey goaltenders
Cincinnati Stingers draft picks
Cincinnati Stingers players
Hampton Gulls (AHL) players
Hampton Gulls (SHL) players
Ice hockey people from Quebec
Laval National players
Living people
Sportspeople from Laval, Quebec
Trois-Rivières Draveurs players
Trois-Rivières Ducs players
Vancouver Canucks draft picks